The Penn Quakers women's lacrosse team is an NCAA Division I college lacrosse team representing the University of Pennsylvania as part of the Ivy League. They play their home games at Franklin Field in Philadelphia, Pennsylvania.

Individual career records

Reference:

Individual single-season records

SeasonsReference:

|-

Postseason Results

The Quakers have appeared in 14 NCAA tournaments. Their postseason record is 14-14.

References

 
1974 establishments in Pennsylvania